The 2017 Morelos Open will be a professional tennis tournament played on outdoor hard courts. It will be the fourth edition of the tournament, which will be part of the 2017 ATP Challenger Tour. It will take place in Cuernavaca, Mexico between 20–25 February 2017.

Singles main draw entrants

Seeds 

 1 Rankings as of 13 February 2017.

Other entrants 
The following players received wildcards into the singles main draw:
  Lucas Gómez
  Luis Patiño
  Antonio Ruiz
  Manuel Sánchez

The following player received entry into the singles main draw as an alternate:
  Alejandro Gómez

The following player received entry into the singles main draw using a protected ranking:
  Kevin King

The following player received entry into the singles main draw as a special exempt:
  Teymuraz Gabashvili

The following players received entry from the qualifying draw:
  Iván Endara
  Gonzalo Escobar
  Daniel Elahi Galán
  Ante Pavić

Champions

Singles 

 Alexander Bublik def.  Nicolás Jarry 7–6(7–5), 6–4.

Doubles 

 Austin Krajicek /  Jackson Withrow def.  Kevin King /  Dean O'Brien 6–7(4–7), 7–6(7–5), [11–9].

References

2017
Morelos Open
Hard court tennis tournaments
Mex